Hypermastus randolphi is a species of sea snail, a marine gastropod mollusk in the family Eulimidae. Bartsch and Vanatta are the major contributors to the taxonomic synonymy of this species of Caenogastropoda.

Description
The length of the shell attains 6 mm, its maximum diameter 2.3 mm, the length of the aperture 2.1 mm, breadth 1,1 mm, diameter of the apex3 mm.

(Original description) The smooth shell is rather slender and shining. It is bluish white when empty, but when the animal is dried in, the spire is orange colored above, pink in the middle with sometimes a slight yellowish band on the body whorl, opaque. The outlines of the spire are straight and conical. The protoconch is blunt, rounded, of moderate size. The suture is impressed. There are no varices.

The shell consists of seven or eight whorls. The body whorl is ovate, the whorls of the spire are a little convex. The aperture is ovate. The outer lipis sloping to the right, nearly straight; in profile it is moderately arched forward below and sometimes retracted very slightly above. The columella is slender, concave below, convex above, forming an angle with the convex 
parietal wall. The parietal callus is very thin.

Distribution
This marine species occurs off Alaska.

References

External links
 To World Register of Marine Species
 Bartsch, P. (1917). A monograph of west American melanellid mollusks. Proceedings of the United States National Museum. 53(2207): 295-356, pl. 34-49
 Warén A. & Crossland M.R.B. (1991). Revision of Hypermastus Pilsbry, 1899 and Turveria (Gastropoda: Prosobranchia: Eulimidae), two genera parasitic on sand dollars. Records of the Australian Museum. 43(1): 85-112

Eulimidae
Gastropods described in 1900